Zapatismo is the armed movement identified with the ideas of Emiliano Zapata, leader of the Mexican Revolution, reflected mainly in the Plan of Ayala term 1911. The members of the Liberation Army of the South led by Zapata were known as "Zapatistas".

One of the most symbolic phrases of Zapatismo was that the land belongs to the tiller, reflecting a kind of agrarian socialism, originally coined by Zapata himself while trying to remove the chieftaincy in Mexico and restore possession of the land to the peasant classes in the south. The phrase and what it represents became the symbols of Mexican agrarianism.

See also

 Economic history of Mexico
 Index of Mexico-related articles
 Neozapatismo
 Plan of Ayala
 Subcommandante Marcos

References

Mexican Revolution
Zapatista Army of National Liberation
Zapatistas
Eponymous political ideologies